North Horr Constituency is an electoral constituency in Kenya. It is one of four constituencies in Marsabit County.  The entire constituency is located within Marsabit County Council area. The constituency was established for the 1988 elections. It is the largest constituency in Kenya on land coverage and hosts the only true desert in Kenya, Chalbi desert. Kenya's well known politician Godana Bonaya was its first member of parliament, and he represented the constituency until his demise in a Kenya Air Force Y-12 plane crash on 10 April 2006 in which all the legislators from Marsabit county perished.

Members of Parliament 

| 2022 || Wario Guyo Adhe || Kenya African National Union (KANU) ||
|}

Locations and wards

References

External links 
Map of the constituency

Constituencies of Marsabit County
Constituencies in Eastern Province (Kenya)
1988 establishments in Kenya
Constituencies established in 1988